Kiekko-Vantaa is an ice hockey team from Vantaa, Finland, playing in the Mestis league. It plays its home games in Trio Areena. Kiekko-Vantaa has been in Mestis since the league started in 2000 and have been in the finals twice, losing both times. The team was owned by South Korean businessman Chung Mong-won from 2012 to 2015.

Honours

Mestis
 Mestis (2): 2003, 2017

Notable players
  Ilari Filppula
  Valtteri Filppula
  Carlo Grünn
  Juha Kaunismäki
  Antti Niemi
  Erkki Rajamäki
  Joonas Vihko
  Hannu Väisänen
  Joonas Rönnberg
  Juha Koivisto
  Sami Heinonen

Retired numbers
 7 Jukka Hakkarainen
 10 Petri Pitkäjärvi
 39 Antti Niemi

References

External links
 Tervetuloa Kiekko-Vantaa Hockey Oy:n verkkosivuille
 Eliteprospects Team Page

Mestis teams
Sport in Vantaa